Medusa was launched at Whitby in 1813. She spent a number of years as a transport, but from the mid-1820s on she sailed between England and Canada. She was abandoned in a sinking state on 1 January 1834.

Career
Medusa first appeared in Lloyd's Register (LR) in 1813 with Hutchinson, master, Barrick, owner, and trade London transport.

In 1820 Medusa may have participated in the British government's 1820 Settlers scheme to bring settlers to South Africa. She arrived at Simon's Bay on 17 June 1820. However there is no record of any passengers arriving on her.

Fate
Medusa was lost around 1833. She is no longer listed in Lloyd's Register in  1834. Lloyd's List reported on 7 January 1834 that a Medusa had been abandoned at sea 60 miles off Flamborough Head. On 1 January 1834 Clyde rescued all ten people on board Medusa, of Whitby as she was in a sinking state. The survivors were Captain Wilson, his wife, and eight crew men. Clyde brought them into Grimsby on 4 January.

Citations

References
 
  

1813 ships
Ships built in Whitby
Age of Sail merchant ships of England
Ships of the 1820 settlers
Maritime incidents in January 1834